Kolu Khedi is a village in the Bhopal district of Madhya Pradesh, India. It is located in the Huzur tehsil and the Phanda block, beside Upper Lake. The nearest railway station is Bakanian Bhaunr.

It is the ancestral village of the politician Najma Heptulla.

Demographics 

According to the 2011 census of India, Kolu Khedi has 323 households. The effective literacy rate (i.e. the literacy rate of population excluding children aged 6 and below) is 88.42%.

References 

Villages in Huzur tehsil